Denise Krimerman Losada (born 4 July 1995) is a Chilean field hockey player.

Krimerman has represented Chile at both junior and senior levels. She made her junior debut at the 2012 Pan-Am Junior Championship, and her senior debut one year later at the 2013 South American Championship.

Krimerman was instrumental in Chile's success at the 2017 Pan American Cup. She scored 2 goals in her team's historic semi-final victory over the United States, including the winner in the last minute. The team ultimately lost to Argentina 4–1 in the final.

Following the Pan American Cup, Krimerman was named the captain of the 2017 Pan American Elite Team by the Pan American Hockey Federation.

References

1995 births
Living people
Chilean female field hockey players
South American Games silver medalists for Chile
South American Games bronze medalists for Chile
South American Games medalists in field hockey
Competitors at the 2014 South American Games
Competitors at the 2018 South American Games
Pan American Games competitors for Chile
Field hockey players at the 2019 Pan American Games
20th-century Chilean women
21st-century Chilean women
Chilean expatriate sportspeople in Germany